The Makerikeri River is a river of the north Canterbury region of New Zealand's South Island.

See also
List of rivers of New Zealand

References

Rivers of Canterbury, New Zealand
Waimakariri District
Rivers of New Zealand